Samuel Henry Baker (1824–1909) was an English landscape artist. He was a member of the Royal Birmingham Society of Artists (RBSA) and the Royal Society of Painter-Etchers and Engravers (RE). He painted rural landscape scenes in watercolour.

Samuel Henry Baker was born in Birmingham, the son of Thomas Baker who was a manager at Matthew Boulton's Soho Works. He was apprenticed to James Chaplin, a magic-lantern slide painter and trained at Birmingham School of Design. He also took lessons from the landscape painter, Joseph Paul Pettitt who had been a pupil of Joseph Vincent Barber. It was possibly through Pettit that Baker inherited the distinctive drawing style of the Birmingham School with its clear outlines and bold cross hatching. He exhibited over five hundred paintings at the RBSA from 1848 to 1909 and was elected a member in 1868.

His older son Oliver (1856–1939) was also an artist and a designer of note, while his younger son Harold (1860-1942) was a noted photographer.

Notes

External links

S H Baker (charterprints.co.uk)
List of works by S H Baker

19th-century English painters
English male painters
20th-century English painters
English watercolourists
Landscape artists
1824 births
1909 deaths
Members and Associates of the Royal Birmingham Society of Artists
20th-century English male artists
19th-century English male artists